The 1977 Kansas Jayhawks football team represented the University of Kansas in the Big Eight Conference during the 1977 NCAA Division I football season. In their third season under head coach Bud Moore, the Jayhawks compiled a 3–7–1 record (2–4–1 against conference opponents), finished in sixth place in the conference, and were outscored by opponents by a combined total of 269 to 131. They played their home games at Memorial Stadium in Lawrence, Kansas.

The team's statistical leaders included Brian Bethke with 384 passing yards, Norris Banks with 655 rushing yards, and David Verser with 220 receiving yards. Tom Fitch, Tom Dinkel, and John Masacarello were the team captains.

Schedule

References

Kansas
Kansas Jayhawks football seasons
Kansas Jayhawks football